Kuiper is a moderate-size crater with a central peak cluster located at  on Mercury. It is 62 kilometers in diameter and was named after Dutch-American astronomer Gerard Kuiper in 1976.  It is one of only 2 Mercurian craters which are named not after artists, and one of very few cases when the same name is used for 3 craters (there are also Kuiper craters on Mars and on the Moon). Gerard Kuiper, being a leader of American planetary science, died shortly before the first images of Mercurian surface were made.

Kuiper overlies the northern rim of the larger crater Murasaki. Kuiper crater has the highest recorded albedo of any region on the planet's surface and has a prominent ray system, suggesting that it is one of the youngest craters.

Kuiper is one of the largest craters of the Kuiperian system on Mercury. The largest is Bartók crater.  The Kuiperian time period is named after Kuiper crater.

Views

References

Links 
 Map of the region with current names of surface features

Impact craters on Mercury
Gerard Kuiper